Megalestes is a genus of malachite in the damselfly family Synlestidae. There are at least 20 described species in Megalestes.

Species
These 20 species belong to the genus Megalestes:

 Megalestes anglicus Cockerell
 Megalestes australis Karube, 2014
 Megalestes chengi Chao, 1947
 Megalestes discus Wilson, 2004
 Megalestes distans Needham, 1930
 Megalestes gyalsey Gyeltshen, Kalkman & Orr, 2017
 Megalestes haui Wilson & Reels, 2003
 Megalestes heros Needham, 1930
 Megalestes irma Fraser, 1926
 Megalestes kurahashii Asahina, 1985
 Megalestes lieftincki Lahiri, 1979
 Megalestes maai Chen, 1947
 Megalestes major Selys, 1862
 Megalestes micans Needham, 1930
 Megalestes omeiensis Chao, 1965
 Megalestes palaceus Zhou & Zhou, 2008
 Megalestes raychoudhurii Lahiri, 1987
 Megalestes riccii Navás, 1935
 Megalestes suensoni Asahina, 1956
 Megalestes tuska Wilson & Reels, 2003

References

Further reading

 
 
 

Synlestidae
Articles created by Qbugbot